Ananta Malla (Nepali: अनन्त मल्ल) was the sixth Malla king of Nepal. He succeeded Jayasimha Malla and reigned from 1271 until his death in 1308.

Reign 
The reign of Ananta Malla was full of conflicts and political unrest. He himself had sat on the throne after deposing Jayasimha Malla with the help of House of Bhonta and the duration of his reign was filled with similar attempts against himself. Jayadityadeva, the elder son of Jayabhimadeva and the current head of House Bhonta, was appointed the heir apparent and had the actual control behind the administration and Ananta Malla reigned as a puppet ruler.

Relationship with Tibet 
Ananta Malla was close with Tibet, which at that time was a protectorate of Kublai Khan. Nepalese art and culture were highly regarded in Tibet and earlier in 1260, Araniko was sent to Tibet to erect a golden stupa.

Invasions from the west 
From 1287 to 1290, Kathmandu valley faced at least three invasion attempts from the Khasa kingdom which was located west of the valley. Khasa kingdom was also ruled by Mallas from Sinja but they were of different origin from the ones in Kathmandu valley. The first invasion in the December of 1287 was not an invasion per se, but Jayatari Malla (Khasa) entered Kathmandu valley and paid tributes to Swayambhunath. After the villagers fled from their homes, Jayatari Malla withdrew.

On 6 March 1289, Jayatari Malla again entered the valley and burnt several villages. He also visited different temples.

For the third time in 26 February 1290, he ensued even more chaos. He annexed Nuwakot, burnt many villages, and also destroyed a castle of Patan before returning back.

Invasions from the south 
Kathmandu valley also faced invasion attempts from Mithila (then called Tirhut) which was then ruled by the Karnat dynasty. In the December of 1291, the Tirhuts invaded the valley and occupied as far as Bhadgaon. They returned on 22 January 1300 and captured Bhadgaon again and inflicted fines on the House of Tripura. They returned back on March 1292. The chronicles say that this invasion was invited by the Bhontas to weaken the Tripuras.

Final years 
In 1307, frustrated from the constant internal conflicts between Bhontas and Tripuras and from the fact that he held no actual power, he took out all the treasury and offered it to Pashupatinath Temple. He then went to Bhontas and died a year later at Banepa.

Succession 
After his death, Nepal went five years without a king and was a victim of several invasions, and conflicts between the two major houses. He was eventually succeeded by Jayanandadeva of House Bhonta, but the actual power lied within the Tripuras.

References

Notes

Bibliography 

 
 
 

Malla rulers
Malla rulers of the Kathmandu Valley
1308 deaths
14th-century Nepalese people
13th-century Nepalese people
Nepalese monarchs
1246 births